Clinistrip, also known as CLINISTIX or the brand name Diastix, are specific clinical sticks for the detection of glucose.

Clinistrip consists of a section that contains glucose oxidase that has been dried onto the paper pad. It is an example of a biosensor-based test for glucose. This is similar to the glucose oxidase assay, as the glucose in the urine, once the stick has been dipped into the urine, is oxidized to yield gluconic acid and hydrogen peroxide. The enzyme peroxidase is also present on the pad, and it utilizes the hydrogen peroxide produced to oxidise a dye that results in a colour change. The intensity of the colour change on the pad reflects the amount of glucose present in the urine.

Biochemistry methods
Chemical tests